This list of current cities, towns, unincorporated communities, counties, and other recognized places in the U.S. state of Pennsylvania also includes information on the number and names of counties in which the place lies, and its lower and upper zip code bounds, if applicable.

See also
List of cities in Pennsylvania
List of counties in Pennsylvania

References
USGS Fips55 database

A